KLBE may refer to:

 KLBE-LP, a low-power radio station (100.7 FM) licensed to Bismarck, North Dakota, United States
 the ICAO code for Arnold Palmer Regional Airport